The 2023 UConn Huskies baseball team represented the University of Connecticut in the 2023 NCAA Division I baseball season.  The Huskies played their home games at Elliot Ballpark on campus in Storrs, Connecticut.  The team is coached by Jim Penders, in his 20th season at UConn.  They played as members of the Big East Conference.

Previous Season
The 2022 Huskies finished with a record of 50–16, the most wins in school history, 16–5 in the Big East.  They won the Big East regular season and Tournament titles and were seeded second in the NCAA College Park Regional, which they swept to advance to the Stanford Super Regional.  They were defeated two games to one in their second overall Super Regional appearance by number two overall seed Stanford.

Personnel

Roster

Coaches

Schedule

References

UConn
UConn
UConn Huskies baseball seasons